The Family Stone is a 2005 American comedy-drama film written and directed by Thomas Bezucha. Produced by Michael London and distributed by 20th Century Fox, it stars an ensemble cast, including Diane Keaton, Craig T. Nelson, Dermot Mulroney, Sarah Jessica Parker, Luke Wilson, Claire Danes, Rachel McAdams, and Tyrone Giordano.

The plot follows the Christmas holiday misadventures of the Stone family in a small New England town when the eldest son, played by Mulroney, brings his uptight girlfriend (played by Parker) home with the intention of proposing to her with a cherished heirloom ring. Overwhelmed by the hostile reception, she begs her sister to join her for emotional support, which triggers further complications.

The Family Stone was released in the United States on December 16, 2005, and was a commercial success with a worldwide gross of $93 million. Parker was nominated for a Golden Globe Award for her performance, while Keaton, Nelson and McAdams each garnered a Satellite Award nomination.

Plot
Set in the fictional town of Thayer, New England, the film focuses on Everett Stone and his rambunctious family. Meredith, Everett’s anxious and bumbling yet refined and educated girlfriend, is dreading spending the Christmas holidays with Everett's family.

Everett's tightknit family respond awkwardly, and soon coldly, to Meredith's stiffness, making her feel like even more of an outsider. Ben, Everett's brother, is the only one who seems to like Meredith. After a series of embarrassing moments, Meredith opts to stay at the local inn and begs her sister Julie to take a bus down to Thayer and join her for support. Everett finds himself drawn to the friendly, more outgoing Julie, whom his family receives very warmly, after Julie has a fall while getting off the bus. Meredith desperately tries to fit in with the Stones, but her strained attempts prove disastrous. During dinner, Everett's gay, deaf brother Thad and his partner Patrick express their plans to adopt a child, prompting a discussion about nature versus nurture and sexual orientation. When Meredith clumsily attempts to engage in the conversation, her choice of words offends everyone and Everett's father Kelly, the most understanding of the family, angrily shuts her down. Distraught, Meredith attempts to drive off but crashes Everett's car, and Ben comes to comfort her. Ben's attraction to Meredith is apparent and the two of them end up at a local bar where, after several drinks, Meredith begins to enjoy herself. She invites Amy's high school flame and local paramedic, Brad Stevenson, to the Stones' house for Christmas breakfast. The next morning, she awakens in Ben's bed and incorrectly assumes that they had sex.

On Christmas Day, the Stone children learn that Sybil, their mother and a breast cancer survivor, recently developed an aggressive recurrence of the disease. Sybil, who originally refused Everett's request for his grandmother's ring to propose to Meredith with, reconsiders her position and offers it to him; but, by now, his feelings for Meredith have shifted to her sister Julie. In a moment of emotional confusionor clarityhe asks Julie to try on the ring, and it gets stuck on her finger. When Julie and Meredith lock themselves in the bathroom to get the ring off, they assume Everett is about to propose to Meredith. The family exchanges gifts and Meredith, unaware of Sybil's failing health, presents each family member with a framed, enlarged photograph of Sybil taken when she was pregnant with Amy. Everyone is touched by her gesture and Meredith relaxes slightly; but, when Everett asks to talk to her, she blurts out that she will not marry him. He counters that he didn't plan to ask her, and Meredith emotionally breaks down in front of the family. All the personality conflicts come to a head, and everyone begins the process of healing.

One year later, the family reunites again for Christmas. Meredith and Ben are a couple, as are Everett and Julie, and Amy and Brad. Thad and Patrick have adopted a baby boy named Gus, and Susannah, the oldest daughter, has had another baby boy named Johnny. It is implied that Sybil passed away over the previous year, and the family remembers her as they gather around the Christmas tree.

Cast
 The Stones
 Diane Keaton as Sybil Stone, the family's strong-willed, bohemian matriarch. A breast cancer survivor, she deals with the recurrence of the fatal illness. Playing the glue that holds the family together, Keaton was the first actor approached to star in the film. With her attachment to the project, Bezucha and London were able to recruit other actors from their wish list. Keaton has stated that she was instantly drawn to her role, as the many layers to Sybil's personality allowed her "to explore so many – often conflicting – emotions."
 Craig T. Nelson as Kelly Stone, Sybil's husband, a college professor in his sixties. Attracted to the role, Nelson felt Kelly was different compared with other patriarchs: "Kelly appears to be the traditional titular head of the Stone household, but it is Sybil who really dominates the family. Despite his low-key personality, Kelly's calming yet offbeat influence on each of his five children is obvious."
 Dermot Mulroney as Everett Stone, Sybil and Kelly's eldest son, a successful Manhattan executive. Mulroney found it challenging playing a seemingly over-achieving, submissive character, commenting, "Everett starts out very button-downed and straight-laced, but by the end of the story he returns to his real personality. He is really like the rest of the Stone family: loose and kind of bohemian."
 Luke Wilson as Ben Stone, Everett's brother, a stoner and film editor, living in Berkeley, California. Wilson characterized Ben as a dramatic contrast to his straight-and-narrow brother Everett: "Compared to his siblings, Ben is a loser character. He's the free spirit of the family."
 Elizabeth Reaser as Susannah Stone Trousdale, the Stones' eldest daughter. A stay-at-home mom who lives in suburban Chicago and has one child, Elizabeth (Savannah Stehlin), she is expecting her second.
 Tyrone Giordano as Thad Stone, the family's youngest son. A deaf and gay architect, who lives in Boston and is contemplating adopting a child with his partner Patrick. Bezucha recruited the services of a sign language teacher who worked closely with each actor in the instruction of American Sign Language during rehearsals and throughout production.
 Rachel McAdams as Amy Stone, the youngest member of the family. Amy is a schoolteacher in the Pioneer Valley, pursuing her master's degree at UMass Amherst, who had previously met Meredith and took an immediate dislike to her. McAdams said she felt "drawn to the dramatic arc that Amy goes through, which eventually brings her full circle. She sees herself as honest, not mean, and expresses that uncensored candor in her sardonic wit."

 Others
 Sarah Jessica Parker as Meredith Morton, Everett's girlfriend later Ben's love interest, an uptight, contemporary New York City career woman from Bedford, New York, who initially fails to bond with her boyfriend's family. Cast amid the final season of her HBO series Sex and the City, Parker, who had struggled to find a role that distinguished her from her TV character Carrie Bradshaw, declared Meredith a breakaway from her previous roles: "She is ... controlling, rigid and tightly wound. When she tries to dig herself out of awkward moments, she only makes matters worse."
 Claire Danes as Julie Morton, Meredith's younger sister and Everett's love interest, who works at a foundation awarding grants to artists. She arrives with the Stones to provide moral support when her sister's life is in a state of chaos. Danes has stated that the film's delicate balance of comedy and drama challenged the cast to walk a fine line between the two styles.
 Brian J. White as Patrick Thomas, Thad's partner. Patrick shows some sympathy to Meredith, hinting that the Stones gave him a hard time as well.
 Jamie Kaler as John Trousdale, Susannah's husband and father to Elizabeth and her baby brother Johnny.
 Paul Schneider as Brad Stevenson, Amy's love interest.
 Bryce and Bradly Harris as Baby Gus, the adopted son of Thad Stone and Patrick Thomas.

Soundtrack
Songs heard on the film's soundtrack include:
 "Let It Snow! Let It Snow! Let It Snow!" performed by Dean Martin
 "Jingle Bells" performed by Johnny Mercer
 "Fooled Around and Fell in Love" performed by Elvin Bishop
 "Miracles" and "Count on Me" performed by Jefferson Starship
 "Right Back Where We Started From" performed by Maxine Nightingale
 "Have Yourself a Merry Little Christmas" performed by Judy Garland in the movie Meet Me in St. Louis, which Susannah watches in a scene.

Release

Box office
The film opened at #3 at the U.S. box office, raking in $12,521,027 USD during its opening weekend behind King Kong and The Chronicles of Narnia. After spending 15 weeks in theatres, The Family Stone earned $60,062,868 in the US and $32,220,983 in foreign markets, bringing its worldwide total to $92,283,851.

Critical reception
The site's critical consensus reads: "This family holiday dramedy features fine performances but awkward shifts of tone." On Metacritic the film has a weighted average score of 56 out of 100, based on 35 reviews, indicating "mixed or average reviews". Audiences surveyed by CinemaScore gave the film an average grade "B+" on an A+ to F scale.

Manohla Dargis of the New York Times wrote "All happy families resemble one another, Tolstoy famously wrote, and each unhappy family is unhappy in its own way, but Tolstoy didn't know the Stones, who are happy in a Hollywood kind of way and unhappy in a self-help kind of way. This tribe of ravenous cannibals bares its excellent teeth at anyone who doesn't accommodate the family's preening self-regard."

In contrast, Roger Ebert of the Chicago Sun-Times gave the film three stars out of four, saying the film "is silly at times, leaning toward the screwball tradition of everyone racing around the house at the same time in a panic fueled by serial misunderstandings [but] there is also a thoughtful side, involving the long and loving marriage of Sybil and Kelly." In Variety, Justin Chang called the film "a smart, tart but mildly undercooked Christmas pudding" and added the "lovingly mounted ensembler  has many heartfelt moments and a keen ear for the rhythms of domestic life, which make the neatly gift-wrapped outcome somewhat disappointing."

Kenneth Turan of the Los Angeles Times said, "A contemporary version of the traditional screwball romantic comedy, The Family Stone is a film that's at times as ragged and shaggy as its family unit. But as written and directed by Thomas Bezucha, its offbeat mixture of highly choreographed comic crises and the occasional bite of reality make for an unexpectedly enticing blend." In Rolling Stone, Peter Travers rated the film three out of four stars and added, "It's a comedy with a dash of tragedythe kind of thing that usually makes me puke. But I fell for this one ... Writer-director Thomas Bezucha lays it on thick, but he knows the mad-dog anarchy of family life and gives the laughs a sharp comic edge."

Accolades

See also
 List of films featuring the deaf and hard of hearing
 List of Christmas films

References

External links
 
 
 
 
 
 

2005 films
2005 comedy-drama films
2005 LGBT-related films
2000s Christmas comedy-drama films
2005 romantic comedy-drama films
20th Century Fox films
American Christmas comedy-drama films
American LGBT-related films
American romantic comedy-drama films
American Sign Language films
2000s English-language films
Films about dysfunctional families
Films about marriage
Films directed by Thomas Bezucha
Films scored by Michael Giacchino
Films set in Connecticut
Films shot in Connecticut
Films shot in New Jersey
Films with screenplays by Thomas Bezucha
LGBT-related romantic comedy-drama films
2000s American films